Events in the year 2005 in Bulgaria.

Incumbents 

 President: Georgi Parvanov
 Prime Minister: Simeon Sakskoburggotski (from 2001 until August 17) Sergei Stanishev (from August 17 until 2009)

Events 

 December – Bulgaria's contingent of 400 light infantry troops leaves Iraq. In February 2006 parliament agrees to dispatch a non-combat guard unit.

Deaths 
 25 August - Reyhan Angelova, Bulgarian singer (n. 1986)

References 

 
2000s in Bulgaria
Years of the 21st century in Bulgaria
Bulgaria
Bulgaria